The Boston College Eagles represent Boston College in Women's Hockey East Association play during the 2017–18 NCAA Division I women's ice hockey season.

Offseason
May 5: Megan Keller and Kali Flanangan were named to the US Women's National Team representing the US in the 2018 Olympics. Both players will take a leave of absence from Boston College for the 2017-18 school year.  They will be joined by alumni Alex Carpenter and Emily Pfalzer.

Recruiting

Standings

Roster

2017–18 Eagles

Schedule

|-
!colspan=12 style=""| Regular Season
 
 
 
 
 
  
 
 
 
 
 
 
 
 
 
 
 
 
 
 
 
 
 
 
 
 
 
 
 
 
 
 
 
 
|-
!colspan=12 style=""| WHEA Tournament 
     
        
 
|-
!colspan=12 style=""| NCAA Tournament

Awards and honors
Daryl Watts, National Rookie of the Month Award, January 2018
Daryl Watts, 2018 Boston College Athletics Female Rookie of the Year Award
Daryl Watts, 2018 Cammi Granato Award, awarded to Women's Hockey East Player of the Year
Daryl Watts, 2018 Hockey East Rookie of the Year
Daryl Watts, 2017-18 First Team Hockey East
Daryl Watts, 2018 Patty Kazmaier Award

All-America status
 Daryl Watts, 2018 First-Team All-America selection
 Caitrin Lonergan, 2018 Second-Team All-America selection
 Toni Ann Miano, 2018 Second-Team All-America selection

References

Boston College
Boston College Eagles women's ice hockey seasons
Boston College Eagles women's ice hockey season
Boston College Eagles women's ice hockey season
Boston College Eagles women's ice hockey season
Boston College Eagles women's ice hockey season